Kabetogama Lake or Lake Kabetogama  is a clear lake in northern St. Louis County, Minnesota. Kabetogama Lake drains into Namakan Lake to the east, and roughly parallels the near-by Rainy Lake. The Ojibwe name Gaa-biitoogamaag-zaaga'igan translates to “the lake that lies parallel with another lake” or “the lake that doubles with another lake” or "the place where there is one lake after another." French fur trappers similarly referred to Kabetogama as Travere or Travers, meaning “alongside.”  A thin peninsula is all that separates the two lakes. The community of Kabetogama, located along the south shores of the Lake serves as the gateway into the park.

Ecology 
Species of fish present in Kabetogama include black crappie, bluegill, burbot, lake sturgeon, lake whitefish, largemouth bass, mooneye, northern pike, rock bass, sauger, shorthead redhorse, silver redhorse, smallmouth bass, tullibee, walleye, white sucker, and yellow perch.

References

External links
 Minnesota Department of Natural Resources

Lakes of St. Louis County, Minnesota
Voyageurs National Park
Lakes of Minnesota